Kahekili II, full name Kahekilinuiʻahumanu, (c. 1737–1794) was an ali'i (Moʻi) of Maui. His name was short for Kāne-Hekili after the Hawaiian god of thunder. Because Kāne-Hekili was believed to be black on one side, Kahekili tattooed one side of his body from head to foot.
He was called Titeeree, King of Mowee by European explorers.

Family 
He was born about 1710–1737 in Hāliʻimaile on the island of Maui. His father was Kekaulike Kalani-nui-Kui-Hono-i-Kamoku the 23rd Moʻi of Maui. His mother was Kekuaipoiwa-nui Kalani-kauhihiwakama Wanakapu (Kekuiapoiwa I, half-sister of Kekaulike). He had at least two wives, and three or four sons and two daughters.

His sister was Kalola.

There is a theory that he was the biological father of Kamehameha I, as Kamehameha I was told this and provided with proof of the same.

Battles

References 

1737 births
1794 deaths
Royalty of Maui
House of Kekaulike
House of Līloa
18th-century monarchs in Oceania